The seventh siege of Gibraltar (1436) was an unsuccessful attempt by the Castillian nobleman Enrique Pérez de Guzmán, 2nd Count de Niebla to capture the stronghold of Gibraltar from the Moors.  He drowned during the attempt.

Background

Gibraltar returned to the control of the Moorish Emirate of Granada after the occupation by Castile in 1309–1333 was ended by the successful third siege of Gibraltar.
In 1411 Gibraltar was briefly occupied by the King of Fez, or Morocco.
Yusuf III, Sultan of Granada, reacted quickly to news of the Moroccan action, 
bringing up troops and conducting a short siege after which he regained control.
This failure led to the deposition of the King of Fez.
The Moors used Gibraltar as a secure base from which they raided the surrounding country, where Enrique de Guzman owned large estates.
They forced the valuable tunny fisheries to close down.

Preparation

Enrique de Guzman wished to stop the depredations, and was also motivated to win fame by recapturing the town that his ancestor Alonso Pérez de Guzmán, founder of his noble house, had first captured in 1309.
In 1436 Enrique de Guzman managed to organize a strong force of knights from Córdoba, Écija and Xeres with boats, provisions and soldiers.
His son, Juan de Niebla, was given command of the land army, with 2,000 cavalry and large numbers of infantry.
A two-pronged attack was planned. The land forces were to come from the north and take the castle and the heights, 
while the sea party would land on the Red Sands below the west of the Rock and take the town.

Siege

The Moors had received warning of the planned attack and had made preparations to meet it.
They had obtained supplies and additional troops from Grenada and Morocco, 
and had greatly strengthened the fortifications in the Red Sands area.
The Count did not realize the state of preparedness of the Moors, 
and personally directed the boat party that attacked the Red Sands.
The Moors did nothing to prevent the boat party from disembarking. 
After landing them, the boats returned to the fleet.
The attackers found themselves on a beach between the sea and a high stone wall.
The tide was coming in, reducing the beach to a narrowing strip, and the Moors were raining rocks and arrows on them from above.

De Guzman, who was superintending the guns on his ship, 
was warned of the massacre of his men that was occurring on shore.
De Guzman went with one of the boats that attempted to rescue the Spanish force.  It became loaded with men.
As more tried to board it, the boat capsized and sank.  De Guzman and forty knights were drowned.
Juan de Guzman had found that the castle could not be taken from the north, 
and was preparing to take his men to help his father when he heard of the disaster.
With a demoralized force and no practical action to be taken, Juan de Guzman abandoned the siege.

Aftermath

The Moors found Enrique de Guzman's body, placed it in a basket and hung it from one of the castle's turrets.
In 1445 King Juan II of Castile made Juan de Guzman the Duke of Medina Sidonia.
The duke was to finally capture Gibraltar in the eighth siege of Gibraltar in 1462.
It was only then, despite many earlier offers by the Christians to redeem the body, that his father's remains could be recovered and placed in a chapel of the Calahorra in the Castle. 
One of Gibraltar's gateways is named after the barcina, or wicker basket, in which Niebla was displayed.

Notes and references
Notes

Citations

Sources

Conflicts in 1436
Sieges of Gibraltar
Gibraltar 1436
1436 in Europe
15th century in Gibraltar
Gibraltar 1436
Battles of the Reconquista